Anguram is a 1982 Indian Malayalam film, directed by Hariharan and produced by Adoor Manikantan. The film stars Prem Nazir, Sharada, Sukumaran, KP Ummer and Kottayam Santha in the lead roles. The film has musical score by M. S. Viswanathan.

Cast

Prem Nazir as Jayan
Sharada as Malini
Sukumaran as Babu
K. P. Ummer as Babu's father
Kottayam Santha as Jayan's mother
Bahadoor as Keshavadas
G. K. Pillai as Govindan
Kaduvakulam Antony as Paraman
Kunjandi as Kuttan Pilla
Nellikode Bhaskaran as Gopalan
Oduvil Unnikrishnan as Pillai 
Reena as Raji
Sripriya as Madhavi 
Bhaskara Kurup as Bhaskaran
 Pushpa

Soundtrack
The music was composed by M. S. Viswanathan and the lyrics were written by O. N. V. Kurup.

References

External links
 

1982 films
1980s Malayalam-language films
Films scored by M. S. Viswanathan
Films directed by Hariharan